Kevin McMahon (17 May 1930 – 14 July 2022) was an Australian rules footballer who played with North Melbourne in the Victorian Football League (VFL).

McMahon, a wingman, made his way up from the North Melbourne thirds to make his first senior appearance in 1949. The following year he played a semi-final, but wasn't selected in North Melbourne's 1950 VFL Grand Final team. In 1951 he finished second in the club's Best and Fairest award. He represented the VFL an interstate match against Western Australia at the Melbourne Cricket Ground in 1955.

References

1930 births
2022 deaths
Australian rules footballers from Victoria (Australia)
North Melbourne Football Club players